Didier Païs (born 8 February 1983 in Colmar) is a French freestyle wrestler. He competed in the freestyle 60 kg event at the 2012 Summer Olympics and was eliminated in the 1/8 finals by Hassan Madani.

References

External links 
 
 
 
 

1983 births
Living people
French male sport wrestlers
Olympic wrestlers of France
Wrestlers at the 2012 Summer Olympics
Sportspeople from Colmar
Mediterranean Games bronze medalists for France
Mediterranean Games medalists in wrestling
Competitors at the 2005 Mediterranean Games
21st-century French people